Drury is a rural town near Auckland, in northern New Zealand. Located 36 kilometres to the south of Auckland CBD, under authority of the Auckland Council. Drury lies at the southern border of the Auckland metropolitan area, 12 kilometres to the northeast of Pukekohe, close to the Papakura Channel, an arm of the Manukau Harbour.

Name
Drury is named after Commander Byron Drury, captain of HMS Pandora, who surveyed the Manukau Harbour in 1853.

History

Coal mining was a significant early industry established in Drury during the 1850s, and saw the formation of the Waihoihoi Mining and Coal Company in 1859. Continued success with coal mining led to the opening of one of New Zealand's earliest tramways by the company in 1862, consisting of 4ft 8in gauge track with a length of 5.2km, whereby coal was transported to Slippery Creek for shipment to Onehunga. Another early industry seen in Drury was that of an extensive brick and pottery works, linked to a nearby quarry by a tram line at the foot of the Drury Hills. The brick and pottery industry in Drury appears to have operated until at least 1928.

Drury was a significant staging area for British soldiers during the New Zealand Wars, who established a camp in the village under the command of General Duncan Cameron. These soldiers also helped to construct an extension to the Great South Road south to the Mangatawhiri Stream.

During the major reform of local government in 1989, Drury was included in the Auckland Region and made up the southern edge of the Papakura District, along with a certain extent of the eastern surrounding rural areas, previously known as Franklin County. Drury was until recently a relatively small semi-rural area nestling at the foot of the low-lying Bombay Hills. Urban spread of Auckland has rendered it an extreme southern suburb, close to the junction between State Highways 1 and 22, both of which head south towards the Waikato region.

After a review of the Royal Commission on Auckland Governance, the entire Auckland Region was amalgamated into a single city authority, the Auckland Council, in 2010. The Papakura District and Franklin District, and all other territorial authorities in the region were abolished and incorporated into the new council. The town of Drury was included in the Franklin ward, one of the thirteen wards of the council.

Future growth

Auckland's largest business park, expected to employ 6900 people, is currently under development in the south of Drury. An estimated 2500 homes are also set to be built in the west of Drury, with development already well underway.

In 2020 the size of the developments and of the Auckland Council contribution was under consideration.

Demographics

Drury had a population of 1,197 at the 2018 New Zealand census, an increase of 93 people (8.4%) since the 2013 census, and a decrease of 51 people (−4.1%) since the 2006 census. There were 360 households, comprising 597 males and 603 females, giving a sex ratio of 0.99 males per female. The median age was 36.0 years (compared with 37.4 years nationally), with 246 people (20.6%) aged under 15 years, 252 (21.1%) aged 15 to 29, 555 (46.4%) aged 30 to 64, and 147 (12.3%) aged 65 or older.

Ethnicities were 73.9% European/Pākehā, 23.3% Māori, 9.8% Pacific peoples, 11.3% Asian, and 1.3% other ethnicities. People may identify with more than one ethnicity.

The percentage of people born overseas was 21.1, compared with 27.1% nationally.

Although some people chose not to answer the census's question about religious affiliation, 49.4% had no religion, 37.6% were Christian, 0.8% had Māori religious beliefs, 1.5% were Hindu, 0.3% were Muslim, 1.0% were Buddhist and 2.8% had other religions.

Of those at least 15 years old, 171 (18.0%) people had a bachelor's or higher degree, and 183 (19.2%) people had no formal qualifications. The median income was $38,500, compared with $31,800 nationally. 201 people (21.1%) earned over $70,000 compared to 17.2% nationally. The employment status of those at least 15 was that 519 (54.6%) people were employed full-time, 135 (14.2%) were part-time, and 36 (3.8%) were unemployed.

Drury Rural

Drury Rural had a population of 2,763 at the 2018 New Zealand census, an increase of 111 people (4.2%) since the 2013 census, and an increase of 279 people (11.2%) since the 2006 census. There were 927 households, comprising 1,416 males and 1,347 females, giving a sex ratio of 1.05 males per female. The median age was 45.4 years (compared with 37.4 years nationally), with 462 people (16.7%) aged under 15 years, 495 (17.9%) aged 15 to 29, 1,377 (49.8%) aged 30 to 64, and 432 (15.6%) aged 65 or older.

Ethnicities were 79.5% European/Pākehā, 13.0% Māori, 4.8% Pacific peoples, 14.2% Asian, and 2.2% other ethnicities. People may identify with more than one ethnicity.

The percentage of people born overseas was 23.7, compared with 27.1% nationally.

Although some people chose not to answer the census's question about religious affiliation, 49.4% had no religion, 37.2% were Christian, 0.4% had Māori religious beliefs, 0.4% were Hindu, 1.1% were Muslim, 1.4% were Buddhist and 3.0% had other religions.

Of those at least 15 years old, 447 (19.4%) people had a bachelor's or higher degree, and 381 (16.6%) people had no formal qualifications. The median income was $42,300, compared with $31,800 nationally. 609 people (26.5%) earned over $70,000 compared to 17.2% nationally. The employment status of those at least 15 was that 1,263 (54.9%) people were employed full-time, 372 (16.2%) were part-time, and 66 (2.9%) were unemployed.

Education
The school opened in 1857. Both these schools are coeducational. Rolls are as of 

 St Ignatius of Loyola Catholic College, is a state-integrated secondary school intended to open in 2024 in Drury. It will be the 15th Catholic College in Auckland.  A significant housing development will also accompany the construction of the college.

Notable buildings 

 St Johns' Church (Anglican)

See also 
 Drury railway station
 Runciman railway station

References

External links
Drury Village 
Photographs of Drury held in Auckland Libraries' heritage collections.

Populated places in the Auckland Region
Suburbs of Auckland